Sheares is a surname. Notable people with the surname include: 

Benjamin Sheares (1907–1981), Singaporean politician
Benjamin Sheares Bridge, the longest bridge in Singapore
Constance Sheares (born 1941), Singaporean arts administrator, curator, and writer
Sheares brothers, Henry (1753–98) and John (1766–1798), Irish lawyers and republicans